Blue Songs is the second studio album by American electronic music band Hercules and Love Affair, released on January 28, 2011 by Moshi Moshi Records. The album features guest appearances from Bloc Party's Kele Okereke on the song "Step Up," and also includes vocal contributions from Kim Ann Foxman, Aerea Negrot and Shaun Wright. The song "It's Alright" is a cover of the Pet Shop Boys' 1988 song of the same name, originally recorded and released by Sterling Void and Paris Brightledge in 1987.

Critical reception

Blue Songs received generally positive reviews from music critics. At Metacritic, which assigns a weighted average rating out of 100 to reviews from mainstream critics, the album received an average score of 68, based on 28 reviews, which indicates "generally favorable reviews". Barry Walters of Spin wrote that "Blue Songs prevailing mood is deep indigo, not ultraviolet, yet that darkness heightens and complicates. By shunning regulation house fierceness, Butler and crew offer gentle nocturnal sacrament."

Track listing

Personnel
Credits adapted from the liner notes of Blue Songs.

Hercules and Love Affair
 Andrew Butler – production
 Kim Ann Foxman – performer, musician
 Aérea Negrot – performer, musician
 Mark Pistel – additional production, co-production, mixing ; performer, musician
 Shaun J. Wright – performer, musician

Additional personnel

 Mike Aaberg – performer, musician
 Rich Armstrong – performer, musician
 Marco Braca – grooming
 Sheldon Brown – performer, musician
 Marcelo Burlon – creative director
 Crane – design
 Simon Davey – mastering
 Lynn Farmer – performer, musician
 Jose Flores – performer, musician
 Raffaele Grossi – assistant photography
 Evan Herring – performer, musician

 Matteo Montanari – photography
 Murdoch – marble engraving
 Kele Okereke – performer, musician
 Patrick Pulsinger – co-production, mixing ; performer, musician
 Jakob Schneidewind – performer, musician
 Martin Siewert – performer, musician
 Jeremy Turner – performer, musician
 Marty Wehner – performer, musician
 Morgan Wiley – performer, musician

Charts

Release history

References

2011 albums
Hercules and Love Affair albums
Moshi Moshi Records albums